Badminton at the 2004 Summer Olympics was held at the Goudi Olympic Hall at the Goudi Olympic Complex from 14 August through 21 August. Both men and women competed in their own singles and doubles events and together they competed in a mixed doubles event.

Medalists

Medal table

Results

Men's singles

Women's singles

Men's doubles

Women's doubles

Mixed doubles

Participating nations
A total of 31 nations competed in the four different badminton events at the 2004 Summer Olympics.

References
 Official Olympic Report

External links
Official result book – Badminton

 
2004 in badminton
2004 Summer Olympics events
2004
Badminton tournaments in Greece